Madison County is a county located in the central portion of the U.S. state of Ohio. As of the 2020 census, the population was 43,824. Its county seat is London. The county is named for James Madison, President of the United States and was established on March 1, 1810.

Madison County is part of the Columbus, OH Metropolitan Statistical Area.

In 2008, Madison County, which spans Interstates 70 and 71 as they converge on Columbus, was cited by the Ohio State Highway Patrol as leading the state for the most speeding tickets 20-mph or more over the posted limit.  Despite a population of around 42,000 in 2006, over 7,700 such tickets were issued in three years.  Three of Madison County's 18 fatal crashes in 2006 and 2007 occurred on interstates. Madison County is also home to the Ohio Peace Officer Training Academy, the
Ohio Bureau of Criminal Identification & Investigation, and several prison facilities.

History
In 1850, Madison County contained 24 churches and one newspaper office, had a total population of 10,015, and the county's public school system had 3838 pupils.  With agriculture as the primary business, that same year the county produced 726,451 bushels of corn, 19,308 tons of hay, 120,696 pounds of wool, and 128,948 pounds of butter.  In 1900, the county had a population of 20,590.

Geography

Adjacent counties
 Union County (north)
 Franklin County (east)
 Pickaway County (southeast)
 Fayette County (south)
 Greene County (southwest)
 Clark County (west)
 Champaign County (northwest)

Major highways

Demographics

2000 census
As of the census of 2000, there were 40,213 people, 13,672 households, and 10,035 families living in the county. The population density was 86 people per square mile (33/km2). There were 14,399 housing units at an average density of 31 per square mile (12/km2). The racial makeup of the county was 91.75% White, 6.24% Black or African American, 0.20% Native American, 0.44% Asian, 0.01% Pacific Islander, 0.35% from other races, and 1.01% from two or more races. 0.73% of the population were Hispanic or Latino of any race.

There were 13,672 households, out of which 35.20% had children under the age of 18 living with them, 59.20% were married couples living together, 9.90% had a female householder with no husband present, and 26.60% were non-families. 22.30% of all households were made up of individuals, and 9.50% had someone living alone who was 65 years of age or older. The average household size was 2.62 and the average family size was 3.06.

In the county, the population was spread out, with 24.70% under the age of 18, 9.10% from 18 to 24, 32.80% from 25 to 44, 22.60% from 45 to 64, and 10.90% who were 65 years of age or older. The median age was 36 years. For every 100 females there were 117.00 males. For every 100 females age 18 and over, there were 121.30 males.

The median income for a household in the county was $44,212, and the median income for a family was $50,520. Males had a median income of $35,251 versus $26,119 for females. The per capita income for the county was $18,721. About 6.20% of families and 7.80% of the population were below the poverty line, including 10.50% of those under age 18 and 8.70% of those age 65 or over.

2010 census
As of the 2010 United States Census, there were 43,435 people, 14,734 households, and 10,580 families living in the county. The racial makeup of the county was 90.6% white, 6.6% black or African American, 0.5% Asian, 0.2% American Indian, 0.5% from other races, and 1.5% from two or more races. Those of Hispanic or Latino origin made up 1.4% of the population. In terms of ancestry, 32.0% were German, 16.5% were Irish, 14.5% were American, and 9.6% were English.

Of the 14,734 households, 34.1% had children under the age of 18 living with them, 55.4% were married couples living together, 11.3% had a female householder with no husband present, 28.2% were non-families, and 23.5% of all households were made up of individuals. The average household size was 2.59 and the average family size was 3.04. The median age was 39.1 years.

The median income for a household in the county was $50,533 and the median income for a family was $63,397. Males had a median income of $46,550 versus $33,193 for females. The per capita income for the county was $23,980. About 8.9% of families and 11.7% of the population were below the poverty line, including 16.1% of those under age 18 and 6.1% of those age 65 or over.

Politics
Madison County is a Republican stronghold county in presidential elections. The only two Democrats to win the county were Franklin D. Roosevelt in 1932 & 1936 and Lyndon B. Johnson in 1964.

|}

Libraries
The following libraries serve the communities of Madison County.
 Hurt/Battelle Memorial Library in West Jefferson, Ohio
 London Public Library in London, Ohio
 Mount Sterling Public Library in Mt. Sterling, Ohio
 Plain City Public Library in Plain City, Ohio

Communities

City
 London (county seat)

Villages
 Midway
 Mount Sterling
 Plain City
 South Solon
 West Jefferson

Townships

 Canaan
 Darby
 Deer Creek
 Fairfield
 Jefferson
 Monroe
 Oak Run
 Paint
 Pike
 Pleasant
 Range
 Somerford
 Stokes
 Union

https://web.archive.org/web/20160715023447/http://www.ohiotownships.org/township-websites

Census-designated places
 Choctaw Lake
 Lafayette
 Plumwood

Unincorporated communities

 Amity
 Big Plain
 Chenoweth
 Chrisman
 Florence
 Gillivan
 Kileville
 Kiousville
 Lilly Chapel
 Madison Lake
 McClimansville
 McKendree
 Newport
 Range
 Resaca
 Rosedale
 Rupert
 Summerford
 Tradersville
 Wrightsville

See also
 Madison Lake State Park
 National Register of Historic Places listings in Madison County, Ohio

References

External links
 Madison County Government's website
 Madison County Chamber of Commerce
 Early Biographies of Madison County, Oh.

 
1810 establishments in Ohio